Goodhand is a surname.  Notable people with the surname include:

 Margo Goodhand, Canadian journalist
 Peter Goodhand, health research executive
 Phillip Goodhand-Tait (born 1945), English singer-songwriter, record producer, and keyboard player

See also
 Good Hands (disambiguation)